Hara Prasad Misra (born 1940)  is an American biochemist and Professor Emeritus of Biomedical Sciences and Pathology in the Virginia-Maryland Regional College of Veterinary Medicine at Virginia Tech. Misra is currently serving as Vice President for Research & Graduate Studies at the Virginia College of Osteopathic Medicine in Blacksburg, VA. Dr. Misra is a well known teacher of undergraduate, graduate and DVM professional students for a period spanning over 30 years.

Misra has served as the principal investigator (PI) on more than $2 million in grants from federal funding agencies while also serving on a number of national and international panels and committees related to his field of expertise in free radical toxicology. He has authored or coauthored more than 130 chapters and scientific articles in peer reviewed publications and has given over 200 presentations and seminars at national and international scientific meetings. According to Google Scholar, he has over 8700 citations in the scientific literature, including 1 paper with >3000 citations, and an H-index of 44.

Current research 
Aging and Neurodegenerative diseases (Alzheimer Disease and Parkinson's Disease): Role of environmental pollutants, molecular mechanism(s), and dietary regulation.

Initiated free radical research during post doctoral studies and has continued research interest in the areas of free radicals and oxidative stress in biology and medicine. His lab is active in studying the health effects associated with free radicals of oxygen, oxidative stress and role of antioxidants in patho-physiological processes. Recently, he has shown that mixtures of pesticides potentiate the immunotoxicity in C57Bl/6 mice and free radicals of oxygen are involved in this process. In addition, his lab is active in studying the mechanism of action of pesticides and MPTP in developing Alzheimer's and Parkinson's Diseases.

Education 
 Utkal University (1962) BVSc. (DVM equivalency)
 Virginia Polytechnic Institute & State University (1968) M.S.
 Virginia Tech (1970) Ph.D.

The Academic Genealogy of Dr. Hara P. Misra

Positions 
 Duke University Medical Center - Post doc
 University of Alabama in Birmingham - Research Associate
 University of California at Davis – Assistant Professor of Physiological Sciences
 Oklahoma Medical Research Foundation - Assistant Professor
 Virginia-Maryland Regional College of Veterinary Medicine (Virginia Tech) - Associate Professor of Biomedical Sciences (1985–1989)
 Virginia-Maryland Regional College of Veterinary Medicine (Virginia Tech) - Department Head (1987–1992)
 Virginia-Maryland Regional College of Veterinary Medicine (Virginia Tech) - Professor of Biomedical Sciences (1989–2005)
 Virginia College of Osteopathic Medicine - Professor of Biochemistry (2005 – current)

Awards 
  Professor Emeritus
 Diplomate, American College of Forensic Examiners Institute (ACFEI)

Editorial boards and panels 
 FASEB
 National Cancer Institute
 National Institutes of Health
 American Institute for Cancer Research

Honors 
 Society of Toxicology
 American Society of Biological Chemists
 Association of Scientists of Indian Origin in America

Field Impact 
Misra has published 120 research articles between the years of 1971–2009 which have collectively been cited over 3625 times.

Selected bibliography

References

American biochemists
Utkal University alumni
Virginia Tech alumni
Living people
1940 births
Indian emigrants to the United States